Molly Antopol is an American fiction and nonfiction writer. As of 2016, she is the Jones Lecturer at Stanford University. Her primary research interests include the Cold War and the Middle East.

She is married to author Chanan Tigay and lives in San Francisco.

Life and career
Antopol was born in Culver City, California.

Her debut story collection The UnAmericans was published in February 2014 by W. W. Norton & Company. In 2014, The UnAmericans was nominated for the National Book Award.

Antopol won the 2015 New York Public Library Young Lions Fiction Award for The UnAmericans. She also won a "5 Under 35" award from the National Book Foundation, the French-American Prize, the California Book Award Silver Medal, and the Ribalow Prize. The book was also a finalist for the PEN/Robert Bingham Prize for Debut Fiction, the National Jewish Book Award, the Barnes and Noble Discover Great New Writers Award, the California Book Award, the Sami Rohr Prize for Jewish Literature and the Edward Lewis Wallant Award.

In the New York Times, critic Dwight Garner favorably compared Antopol's work to that of Grace Paley and Allegra Goodman, finding the writing "Fresh and offbeat… memorable and promising.” In reviewing The UnAmericans for NPR, author Meg Wolitzer commented that the stories "make you nostalgic, not just for earlier times, but for another era in short fiction. A time when writers such as Bernard Malamud, and Isaac Bashevis Singer, and Grace Paley roamed the earth.” 

She is a former Wallace Stegner Fellow and is currently a Jones Lecturer at Stanford University.

She is the recipient of a Radcliffe Institute fellowship at Harvard University (2017), the Berlin Prize at the American Academy in Berlin (2017), and a fellowship from the American Library in Paris (2019).

Awards and honors
2019 Visiting fellow at the American Library in Paris
2017 Berlin Prize at the American Academy in Berlin
2016 Radcliffe Institute Fellowship at Harvard University
2015 Ribalow Prize for The UnAmericans
 2015 New York Public Library Young Lions Fiction Award for The Un-Americans
 2014 National Book Award nominee for The Un-Americans
 2014 National Book Foundation 5 Under 35 Award for The Un-Americans
 2014 California Book Awards Silver Medal First Fiction winner for The Un-Americans
 2014 National Jewish Book Award Finalist for The Un-Americans 
 2014 Barnes and Noble Discover Award (2nd Place) for The Un-Americans
 2014 PEN/Robert W. Bingham Award for Debut Fiction Finalist for The Un-Americans 
 2014 Sami Rohr Prize for Jewish Literature Finalist for The Un-Americans
 2014 Edward Lewis Wallant Award for Jewish Fiction Finalist for The Un-Americans

References

External links
Official Website
New York Times review of The UnAmericans

Living people
American women short story writers
Writers from California
21st-century American short story writers
21st-century American women writers
People from Culver City, California
University of California, Santa Cruz alumni
Stanford University faculty
Columbia University School of the Arts alumni
1978 births